Cardoso is a municipality in the state of São Paulo, Brazil. As of 2020, the city has a population of 12,349 inhabitants and an area of 639.7 km².

Cardoso belongs to the Mesoregion of São José do Rio Preto.

References

Municipalities in São Paulo (state)